Katie Branch is a  long 1st order tributary to Reedy Fork in Guilford County, North Carolina.

Course
Katie Branch rises on the Rocky Branch divide about 2 mile southeast of Monticello, North Carolina in Guilford County.  Katie Branch then flows south to meet Reedy Fork about 5 miles southeast of Monticello.

Watershed
Katie Branch drains  of area, receives about 46.0 in/year of precipitation, has a topographic wetness index of 419.08 and is about 41% forested.

References

Rivers of North Carolina
Rivers of Guilford County, North Carolina